The Robert Ostertag House is a historic home located in the Country Club District, Kansas City, Missouri  It was designed by architect Mary Rockwell Hook and built in 1922 for $15,000 for Robert A. Ostertag, president of a tin can company.  It is a "T"-shaped dwelling faced with stucco.

It was listed on the National Register of Historic Places in 1983.

References

Houses on the National Register of Historic Places in Missouri
Houses completed in 1922
Houses in Kansas City, Missouri
National Register of Historic Places in Kansas City, Missouri